Al-Jafr (also spelled Al-Jafer or Al-Jafar) ( Arabic = الجفر ) is a village in Al-Ahsa in Saudi Arabia. It is located about 10 km from Al-Hofuf and one of the eastern villages of Al-Ahsa. Unlike nearby villages Al-Jafr has some government offices like Al-Jafr police station.

See also
Al-Ahsa

References

Populated places in Eastern Province, Saudi Arabia